Robinswood Road is a tram stop for Phase 3b of the Manchester Metrolink. It opened on 3 November 2014. and is on the Airport Line on Simonsway at the junction of Brownley Road and Ruddpark Road, with Manchester Airport-bound services stopping to the left of the junction and Manchester-bound services stopping to the right. For a brief period during construction, it appeared the stop would simply be named "Robinswood". Its up and down platforms are staggered (one on each side of a side road) and not opposite each other.

Services
Trams run every 12 minutes north to Manchester Victoria and south to Manchester Airport (every 20 minutes before 6 am).

A 2010 Greater Manchester Integrated Transport Authority report for resolution deemed the stop as non essential.

It suggested a saving of £1.2 million could have been made by removing the stop from the scheme without any detriment to future income. The stop is within a couple of minutes walk of the Wythenshawe Town Centre stop and the Peel Hall stop.

The stop is one of the least used on the Metrolink network.

Ticket zones 
Robinswood Road stop is located in Metrolink ticket zone 4.

References

External links

 Metrolink stop information
 Robinswood Road area map
 Light Rail Transit Association
 Airport route map

Tram stops in Manchester